is a Kyodai Hero tokusatsu series that premiered April 9, 2006 and aired at 7:30pm on NHK and ran for 13 episodes.  WoO was one of many unused ideas created by Eiji Tsuburaya as story connecting to the show Ultra Q.  The story revolves around a living creature which came from a comet named WoO; in the series, WoO is befriended by a young girl named Ai; both are chased by a mysterious organization called SWORD who sees WoO as a threat to humanity.  At the same time, giant monsters have invaded in search of WoO.  The story itself follows the original script Tsuburaya intended for the show. In addition, a manga series was published a year later which was loosely based on the series of the same name.

Main characters

 WoO: The only survivor of his species wandered in space until he crashed on Earth.  There, he befriended Ai and develops a strong bond with her that he'd protect her at any cost.  He uses his antennae to connect to electronic devices (mainly a cell phone) to communicate with Ai.
 Ai Kumasiro: Junior high school 2nd grade.  She stays with her mother and loves soccer.  She travels with WoO after their encounter.  Her school is then attacked by a giant monster, which resulted in her being the lone survivor of the attack.
 Kiyomi Kumasiro: Ai's mother and secondary chief editor at the magazine "CHEMISTRY."
 Akita: A reporter of magazine "CHEMISTRY" of the same publisher as Kiyomi.
 Kotaro: Ai's classmate. After he leaves working in the Convenient Store; his dream is to become a movie director.  He seems to be attracted to Ai.

SWORD Organization

 Yaman: The leader of SWORD.  It reveals that his daughter was killed in the incident that Ai survived and because of that holds a personal vendetta against the alien life forms, including WoO.
 Kirishi: Field Agent for SWORD.
 Katsura: Field Researcher for SWORD, she eventually becomes an ally to Ai and WoO helping them escape from her colleagues.
 Sakuraba: Field Agent of SWORD who keeps tabs on Ai and WoO.
 Nagakura: Biological Researcher for SWORD.  He uses WoO's artifact and turns into the monster Gelnoide in episodes 12 and 13.
 Gonda: Katsura's sweetheart and ace combat specialist for SWORD's mobile unit.  He is portrayed by Shigeki Kagemaru (who played GUTS Member Tetsuo Shinjou in Ultraman Tiga).
 Waver: Head of SWORD's mobile unit and his part of SWORD's US branch in Arizona.

WoO's Forms

 Egg Form: The shape WoO used to travel in space.
 Inflated Form: An expanded version of normal form; WoO grows bigger than Ai, but still fights monsters in its normal form.
 Fossil Form: WoO reverts to this form due to exhaustion fighting as a giant.  It takes water to revive him into his normal form.
 Rucksack Form: Due to WoO's shapeshifting abilities, he takes this form when traveling with Ai to disguise himself from public.
 Aikichi Form: A fusion of WoO and Ai's energies resulting in WoO turning into a Giant to fight other daikaiju; after fighting he turns into his Fossil Form.

Episodes

Monsters
Gelnake (Episodes 1 & 2)
Galrobe (Episode 3)
Gelbelio (Episode 4)
Gelbile (Episode 5)
Gelbile MK (Episode 10)
Gelnoide (Episodes 12 & 13)

Manga

A year after the show ended its run a manga Shoujo series of the same name was published but compare to the TV show the manga features elements & traits that defers greatly from the show that the manga was loosely based on. Unlike the TV show the manga had a more lighthearted feel with a Slice of life style genre thus distant it from the more Kyodai Hero style series and because of this the manga solely focused on the main characters.

Songs
 Opening theme: "Guardian Angel" by Splash Candy
 Ending theme:  by

References

External links
 

2006 Japanese television series debuts
2006 Japanese television series endings
Tsuburaya Productions
NHK original programming
Ultra television series